FNTI (formerly known as First Nations Technical Institute) is an Indigenous-owned and -governed post-secondary institute located in Tyendinaga Mohawk Territory in Ontario. The institute puts on programming rooted in Indigegogy and Indigenous ways of knowing.

FNTI is a registered non-profit/charitable organization, accredited by the World Indigenous Nations Higher Education Consortium (WINHEC), a member of Colleges and Institutes Canada (CICan), and undergoing the process of an organizational review with the Indigenous Advanced Education and Skills Council.

As of July 2020, FNTI has over 4,000 graduates with certificate, diploma and degree credentials issued in partnership with recognized Ontario colleges and universities. The institute will begin the delivery of standalone bachelor's degrees in 2020 in accordance with the Indigenous Institutes Act, 2017.

As of July 2020, FNTI has an overall graduation rate of 93% and its graduates have a 98% employment rate.

History

In 1917, the Canadian Royal Flying Corps survey operation identified the flatlands of Tyendinaga as an excellent location for a flight training facility, Camp Mohawk. In 1985, FNTI federally incorporated to create educational pathways for Indigenous Peoples.

FNTI started their First Peoples’ Aviation Technology – Flight program in 1989 to train First Nations, Métis and Inuit pilots on the former Camp Mohawk site.

Partnerships

Since its inception, the institute has delivered certificate, diploma and degree credentials issued in partnership with recognized Ontario colleges and universities. In 2020, FNTI will begin delivering its own standalone bachelor's degrees in accordance with the Indigenous Institutes Act, 2017.

2019–2020 College and University Partners:

Canadore College
Queen's University
Toronto Metropolitan University
St. Lawrence College
Wilfrid Laurier University

Accreditation and Associations:

Colleges and Institutes Canada (CICan)
Indigenous Advanced Education and Skills Council (IAESC)
World Indigenous Nations Higher Education Consortium (WINHEC)

Programs offered

Post-Secondary Programs at FNTI in Partnership with Ontario Colleges and Universities
Diploma Level

Early Childhood Education (Canadore College)
Mental Health and Addiction Worker (Canadore College)
Social Service Worker (Canadore College)

Advanced Diploma Level

First Peoples' Aviation Technology—Flight (Canadore College)

Degree Level

Bachelor of Arts Public Administration and Governance (Ryerson University)
Bachelor of Social Work (Ryerson University)

Graduate Level

Master of Social Work  (Wilfrid Laurier University)
Master of Public Administration (Queen's University)

Programs under development
FNTI Standalone bachelor's degrees for delivery in 2020:
Bachelor of Arts and Science Indigenous Sustainable Food Systems
Bachelor of Health Sciences Indigenous Midwifery
Bachelor of Indigenous Social Work

References

External links

1985 establishments in Ontario
Educational institutions established in 1985
First Nations education
Indigenous universities and colleges in North America
Universities and colleges in Ontario
First Nations in Ontario